Protection is any measure taken to guard a thing against damage caused by outside forces.

Protection, protected, protective, or protect may also refer to:

Places
Protection, Georgia, an unincorporated area
Protection, Kansas, a city
Protection, New York, a hamlet

Arts, entertainment, and media

Films
 Protected (film), a 1975 documentary film
Protection (1929 film), a 1929 film
Protection (2000 film), a 2000 film directed by Bruce Spangler
Protection (2001 film), a 2001 film directed by John Flynn

Music

Albums
Protection (Face to Face album) or the title song, 2016
Protection (Massive Attack album) or the title song (see below), 1994
 Protect: A Benefit for the National Association to Protect Children, a 2005 punk album

Songs
"Protection" (Donna Summer song), 1982
"Protection" (Graham Parker song), 1979
"Protection" (Massive Attack song), 1994
"Protection" (Allday song), 2019
"Protection", a 1977 song by Krokus from To You All
"Protection", a 2014 song by Lucinda Williams from Down Where the Spirit Meets the Bone

Other uses
 Protect (political organization), an American political advocacy group, an American law
 Protect (Charity), a UK charity 
 Protected (computer programming), an access specifier in many object-oriented programming languages
 Protection (poker), a poker bet with a strong but vulnerable hand
Protection, a slang term for condoms
 Protectionism, an economic policy advocated to shield a sector in a country's economy from foreign competitors
 PROTECT Act of 2003, U.S. law to prevent child abuse and violent crimes against children
 Protective Life, an American financial services company
 Protective Stadium, a sports venue under construction in Birmingham, Alabama sponsored by the above company

See also
 
 
 
 
 Defense (disambiguation)
 Preservation (disambiguation)
 Preserve (disambiguation)
 Project (disambiguation) 
 Protector (disambiguation)
 Safety, condition of being protected from harm
 Security, freedom from or resilience against potential harm